This is the comprehensive discography of global pop group Now United. They have released 75 singles (including 1 as a featured artist), 5 promotional singles and 75 music videos.

Albums

Soundtrack albums

Singles

As lead artist

Love, Love, Love. A Musical soundtrack

The Musical: Welcome to the Night of Your Lives soundtrack

As featured artist

Promotional singles

Remix versions

Music videos

Notes 
 #Clips: United States (Hawaii), Brazil, Philippines, South Korea, Japan, China, Mexico, United Arab Emirates, India, Lebanon.
 There is a live acoustic version
  #Home: France, England, India, Japan, Brazil, United States, Russia, Mexico, Senegal, Philippines, South Korea, Finland, Germany, Spain, Lebanon, Ivory Coast and Australia.
  Based in the United States and old images recorded in other countries.
  Now unavailable.
  #Concerts: Australia, Brazil, Canada, China, Finland, Germany, India, Japan, Mexico, Russia, Senegal, South Korea, United States, Sweden, Austria, Russia.

References 

Discography
Pop music group discographies